Standings and results for Group 2 of the UEFA Euro 1996 qualifying tournament.

Standings

Results

Goalscorers

References

A. Yelagin - History of European Championships 1960-2000 (Terra-Sport, Moscow, 2002) - attendance information

Group 2
1994–95 in Spanish football
qual
1994–95 in Republic of Macedonia football
1995–96 in Republic of Macedonia football
1994–95 in Danish football
Qual
1994–95 in Belgian football
1995–96 in Belgian football
1994–95 in Cypriot football
1995–96 in Cypriot football
1994 in Armenian football
1995 in Armenian football